Charles Emory Smith (February 18, 1842 – January 19, 1908) was an American journalist and political leader.

Early life

Charles Emory Smith was born in Mansfield, Connecticut on February 18, 1842. In 1849 his family removed to Albany, New York, where he attended the public schools and The Albany Academy. He graduated from Union College in 1861, was a recruiting officer on the staff of General John F. Rathbone (1819–1901) in 1861-1862, taught in the Albany Academy in 1862-1865, and was editor of the Albany Express in 1865-1870. He joined the staff of the Albany Journal in 1870, and was editor-in-chief of this paper from 1876 to 1880. In 1879-1880 he was a regent of the University of the State of New York. From 1880 until his death he was editor and part proprietor of the Philadelphia Press.

Career
He was active as a Republican in state and national politics; was chairman of the Committee on Resolutions of the New York State Republican Conventions from 1874 to 1880 (excepting 1877), and was president of the convention of 1879; and was a delegate to several Republican National Conventions, drafting much of the Republican platforms of 1876 and 1896.

In 1890 to 1892 he was United States minister to Russia, and during that period had charge of distributing among the Russian famine sufferers five shiploads of food and other supplies, valued at an estimated $750,000. He was Postmaster General in the cabinet of Presidents McKinley and Roosevelt from April 1898 until January 1902, and did much to develop the rural free delivery system.

He died at his home in Philadelphia on January 19, 1908. He is buried at West Laurel Hill Cemetery in Bala Cynwyd, River Section, Lot 726.

Notes

External links

 Men of Mark in America Biography & Portrait
 

1842 births
1908 deaths
United States Postmasters General
Union College (New York) alumni
Politicians from Philadelphia
Ambassadors of the United States to Russia
American newspaper editors
Theodore Roosevelt administration cabinet members
20th-century American politicians
McKinley administration cabinet members
19th-century American politicians
Regents of the University of the State of New York
19th-century American diplomats
New York (state) Republicans
The Albany Academy alumni